HD 240237 is a star in the northern constellation of Cassiopeia. It is an orange star that can be viewed with binoculars or a small telescope, but is too faint to be seen with the naked eye at an apparent visual magnitude of 8.19. This object is located at a distance of approximately 3,100 light years away from the Sun based on parallax, but is drifting closer with a radial velocity of −25 km/s.

This is an aging giant star with a stellar classification of K2III; a star that has exhausted the supply of hydrogen at its core and expanded to 78 times the radius of the Sun. S. Gettel and associates (2011) estimate the star is around 270 million years old with 1.7 times the mass of the Sun. However, S. G. Sousa and associates found a much lower mass of 0.61 times the mass of the Sun. It is radiating 1,244 times the Sun's luminosity from its enlarged photosphere at an effective temperature of 3,878 K.

Planetary system
In 2011, Gettel et al. announced the discovery of a planet orbiting this star. Sousa et al. The designation b for this object, derives from the order of discovery. The designation of b is given to the first planet orbiting a given star, followed by the other lowercase letters of the alphabet. In the case of HD 240237, there was only one planet, so only the letter b is used.

References 

K-type giants
Planetary systems with one confirmed planet
Cassiopeia (constellation)
Durchmusterung objects
240237
114840
J23154222+5802358